Emanuele Maniscalco (born 1983) is an Italian jazz pianist, drummer and composer.

Life and career
Maniscalco was born in Brescia in 1983. He began playing the piano at the age of 8 and the drums at 12. He is largely self-taught on both instruments, but he attended the monthly workshops of Stefano Battaglia in Siena between 2001 and 2008. He played with trumpeter Enrico Rava between 2004 and 2007.

In 2012, Maniscalco recorded for ECM Records as drummer and co-leader of the trio Third Reel. Two years later, the same group, this time with Maniscalco on piano and drums, recorded Many More Days for ECM.

Compositions
"As early influences on his compositional style he cites Carla Bley, Paul Motian and Charlie Haden."

Discography
An asterisk (*) indicates that the year is that of release.

As leader/co-leader

As sideman

References

Aut Records
Aut Records artists
1983 births
Italian jazz drummers
Male drummers
Italian jazz pianists
Italian male pianists
Living people
Musicians from Brescia
21st-century pianists
21st-century drummers
21st-century Italian male musicians
Male jazz musicians
Ilk Records artists